Sur La Terre International is a quarterly lifestyle magazine present in various cities all around the world.

Overviews
Sur La Terre International is a network of city magazines exploring the universe of rare and innovative products and targeting jet-sets places of Europe and the world. It was founded in 1998 and taken over in 2005 by the publishing company Publibrands SA.

Sur La Terre is present in various European cities as Geneva, Zürich, Gstaad and Saint-Tropez, as well as in big worldwide cities such as Moscow, Bangkok, Singapore and Doha.	

The magazine is published quarterly (March, June, September, December) or on seasonal basis for some coast or mountain luxury resorts.

Sur La Terre targets high-net-worth individuals, CEO, managers or opinion leaders as well as art or and design specialists.

Content
The concept of Sur La Terre is to offer an international content for all the magazines and a local content, likely to every city where it is published. The international part tackles luxury subjects like art, fashion, decoration and travel. As for the local part, it is about various events planned in the city concerned, shopping or leisure.

Cities

Sur La Terre is distributed in the following 16 cities:

 Bangkok
 Courchevel
 Crans-Montana
 Doha
 Gstaad
 Megève
 Moscow
 Singapore
 Saint Moritz
 Zürich

References

External links
 Magazine official website

1998 establishments in Switzerland
Lifestyle magazines
Magazines established in 1998
Quarterly magazines published in Switzerland
Magazines published in Switzerland